Every December, British music magazine NME compiles a list of what it considers the best albums of the year. It was started in 1974. The list is usually published in one of the issues sold before Christmas – in 2006 it was published in the issue for December the 9th. The companion list is NME single of the year.

The NME Album of the Year list is compiled by the music reviewers and independent journalists who work for the magazine and for NME.com. Each picks his or her top 20 albums of the year and hands them in to the editor. An album marked at Number One gets 20 points, Number Two gets 19 points and so on until the 20th, which gets one point. All of the points from the various top 20s are then gathered together and the overall favourites are worked out and ranked for publication in the official list. The album with the most points overall is Number One in the list, the one with the second most points is Number Two and so on. There have been, to date, three artists who have won Album and Single of the Year in the same year: Joy Division in 1980, Klaxons in 2007 and MGMT in 2008. Cecil Womack and Bobby Womack also won Single & Album of the Year respectively in 1984. Also Lorde in 2017 won both Single and Album of the year.

Sometimes, winners may change in the NME Awards. For example, the NME Album of the Year for 2000 was Rated R by Queens of the Stone Age, with XTRMNTR by Primal Scream in 2nd place, XTRMNTR was later voted the best album of 2000 however in the NME Carling Awards 2001.

Albums of the Year

References

 NME magazine, 9 December 2006
NME End of year critic lists

New Musical Express
1974 establishments in the United Kingdom
Annual events in the United Kingdom
Awards established in 1974
British music awards
Lists of albums
Recurring events established in 1974